Mikstat  is a town in Ostrzeszów County, Greater Poland Voivodeship, Poland, with 1,906 inhabitants (2011).

References

Cities and towns in Greater Poland Voivodeship
Ostrzeszów County
Sieradz Voivodeship (1339–1793)
Poznań Voivodeship (1921–1939)